|}

The Becher Chase is a Premier Handicap National Hunt steeplechase in Great Britain which is open to horses aged six years or older. It is run at Aintree over a distance of about 3 miles and 2 furlongs (3 miles 1 furlong and 188 yards, or 5,201 metres), and during its running there are twenty-one fences to be jumped. It is a handicap race, and it is scheduled to take place each year in November or December.

It is run over the same fences as Aintree's most famous race, the Grand National, and it serves as an early-season trial for that event. Two winners have gone on to win the Grand National; Amberleigh House and Silver Birch. Earth Summit won the race in 1998 following his Grand National win the previous April.

One of the obstacles jumped is Becher's Brook, which is named in memory of Martin Becher (1799–1864). The Becher Chase was established in 1992, when a new race meeting was introduced at Aintree. For the twenty years prior to this, the Grand National meeting had been the venue's only horse racing fixture of the year. The Becher Chase was upgraded to Grade Three by the British Horseracing Board (BHA) from its 2014 running and was re-classified as a Premier Handicap from the 2022 running when Grade 3 status was renamed by the BHA.

Records
Most successful horse (2 wins):
 Into The Red – 1994, 1996
 Hello Bud - 2010, 2012
 Walk In The Mill - 2018, 2019
 Vieux Lion Rouge - 2016, 2020

Most successful jockey (2 wins):
 Chris Maude - Indian Tonic (1993), Young Hustler (1995)
 Tony Dobbin - Into The Red (1996), Feels Like Gold (1999)
 Sam Twiston-Davies - Hello Bud (2010, 2012)
 James Best - Walk In The Mill (2018, 2019)

Most successful trainer (6 wins):
 Nigel Twiston-Davies - Indian Tonic (1993), Young Hustler (1995), Earth Summit (1998), Hello Bud (2010, 2012), Blaklion (2017)

Winners
 Weights given in stones and pounds.

See also
 Horse racing in Great Britain
 List of British National Hunt races

References

 Racing Post:

 aintree.co.uk – 2009 John Smith's Grand National Media Guide.
 pedigreequery.com – Becher Chase – Aintree.

External links
 Race Recordings 
 Official Site of the Becher Chase 

National Hunt races in Great Britain
Aintree Racecourse
National Hunt chases
Recurring sporting events established in 1992
1992 establishments in England